Hananokuni Akihiro (born 15 October 1959 as Akihiro Noguchi) is a former sumo wrestler from Fujiidera, Osaka, Japan.

Career
He made his professional debut in March 1975, joining Hanakago stable. He joined Hanaregoma stable when Hanakago was wound up in 1985. After many years in the lower ranks he finally reached the makuuchi or top division in March 1988 at the age of 28. His best result in a tournament came in September 1988 when he won eleven bouts, defeated ōzeki Konishiki and received the Fighting Spirit Award. He defeated yokozuna Hokutoumi in September 1989 to earn his only kinboshi. Chiyonofuji defeated him in March 1990 to become the first wrestler to win 1000 career bouts. His highest rank was maegashira 1. His last appearance in the top division came in November 1992 and he spent the last two years of his career back in the jūryō and makushita divisions.

Retirement from sumo
Upon his retirement in November 1994 he was unable to obtain elder stock and become a member of the Japan Sumo Association. However, he was able to remain in sumo by becoming a wakaimonogashira, a kind of record keeper and odd job man which is a salaried role within the Sumo Association. He can often be seen assisting with the presentation of prizes to the yūshō winner at the conclusion of tournaments. He is attached to Shibatayama stable.

Fighting style
Hananokuni′s favoured kimarite or techniques included yori taoshi (force out and down), uwatenage (overarm throw) and shitatedashinage (pulling inner arm throw. He used a migi yotsu grip on the mawashi, with his left hand outside and right hand inside his opponent′s arms.

Career record

See also
Glossary of sumo terms
List of past sumo wrestlers

References

1959 births
Living people
Japanese sumo wrestlers
Sumo people from Osaka Prefecture
People from Fujiidera, Osaka